Mogens Christian Gade (born 8 March 1961) is a Danish politician. He is a member of the party Venstre, and is the current mayor in Jammerbugt Municipality.

References 

1961 births
Living people
Mayors of places in Denmark
Danish municipal councillors
People from Jammerbugt Municipality
Venstre (Denmark) politicians